On June 5, 1984, an air battle took place near Arabi Island in the Persian Gulf. Two Iranian Air Force F-4 Phantoms from Bushehr Air Base, had intruded into Saudi airspace  setting up for an attack on oil tankers. The planes were tracked by a United States Air Force E-3 Sentry AWACS aircraft, which directed two patrolling Saudi F-15 Eagles to intercept the Iranians. The Saudis shot down 1 Iranian F-4 Phantom, killing 1st Lts Homayoun Hekmati & weapon systems officer Seyed Sirous Karimi while damaging the second F-4, which despite being damaged, was able to make an emergency landing at Kish Airport, but the aircraft could not be repaired and returned to service, thus it was written off. This caused the Iranians to scramble 11 additional F-4s from Bushehr. In response, the Royal Saudi Air Force scrambled 11 additional F-15s. Seeing this, the Iranians backed down, and subsequently the Saudis returned to base.

References

Airstrikes during the Iran–Iraq War
Battles involving Iran
Battles involving Saudi Arabia
Military operations of the Iran–Iraq War in 1984
1984 in Saudi Arabia
Iran–Saudi Arabia relations
Iran–Saudi Arabia military relations
Iran–Saudi Arabia proxy conflict